Harutaeographa akos is a moth of the family Noctuidae. It is found in Tadjikistan (Gissar Mountains).

References

Moths described in 1996
Orthosiini